The following highways are numbered 339:

Canada
Prince Edward Island Route 339
 Quebec Route 339
Saskatchewan Highway 339

India
 National Highway 339 (India)

Ireland
 R339 regional road

Japan
 Japan National Route 339

United States
  Georgia State Route 339
  Louisiana Highway 339
  Nevada State Route 339
 New York:
  New York State Route 339 (former)
 New York State Route 339 (former)
 County Route 339 (Saratoga County, New York)
  Ohio State Route 339
  Oregon Route 339
  Pennsylvania Route 339
  Texas State Highway 339
  Virginia State Route 339
  Washington State Route 339
  Wyoming Highway 339
Territories
  Puerto Rico Highway 339